Bahner is an unincorporated community in Pettis County, Missouri, United States.

A post office called Bahner was established in 1882, and remained in operation until 1907. Edward Bahner, an early postmaster, most likely gave the community his name.

References

Unincorporated communities in Pettis County, Missouri
Unincorporated communities in Missouri